MetroCentre is a railway station on the Tyne Valley Line, which runs between  and  via . It is owned by Network Rail and managed by Northern Trains.

History
The station was opened on 3 August 1987 by British Rail, and was initially named Gateshead MetroCentre. The station's name was later shortened to MetroCentre on 17 May 1993.

The station is situated on a section of line built by the North Eastern Railway, which was constructed in sections between 1893 and 1909. It linked the lines over the newly commissioned King Edward VII Bridge with the original Newcastle and Carlisle Railway freight route to Redheugh and Dunston Coal Staiths, dating back to 1837.

Refurbishment 
Between January and February 2020, the platforms at the station were extended ahead of the introduction of upgraded rolling stock, as part of the Great North Rail project.

Facilities
The station has two platforms, both of which have seating, a waiting shelter, next train audio and visual displays and an emergency help point. There is a footbridge linking the station with the Metrocentre, which provides step-free access to both platforms.

MetroCentre has recently joined the Northern Trains penalty fare network, as new ticket machines were installed at the station in December 2020.

Services

On Sunday, there are three trains per hour between Newcastle and MetroCentre, one of which continues to Carlisle. All services are operated by Northern Trains.

Rolling stock used: Class 156 Super Sprinter and Class 158 Express Sprinter

References

External links
 

Railway stations in Tyne and Wear
Railway stations opened by British Rail
Railway stations in Great Britain opened in 1987
Northern franchise railway stations